Adagio and Allegro, Op. 70, is a chamber music piece in A-flat major for piano and horn (optionally cello or violin or viola) by Robert Schumann. It was written in February 1849. Schumann planned alternative editions before it was printed in which the horn or cello or violin can be replaced. The title was initially intended to be "Romance and Allegro". Schumann then decided on "Adagio and Allegro".

Shortly after this work was completed, Clara Schumann commented that it was "just the sort of piece that I like, brilliant, fresh and passionate."

References

External links

Chamber music by Robert Schumann
Compositions for piano
Compositions for horn
1849 compositions
Compositions in A-flat major